The Hitchhiker's Guide to the Galaxy is a 2005 science fiction comedy film directed by Garth Jennings, based upon previous works in the media franchise of the same name, created by Douglas Adams. It stars Martin Freeman, Sam Rockwell, Mos Def, Zooey Deschanel, Bill Nighy, Anna Chancellor, John Malkovich, and the voices of Stephen Fry, Helen Mirren, Thomas Lennon, Richard Griffiths, Ian McNeice, Bill Bailey and Alan Rickman. Adams co-wrote the screenplay with Karey Kirkpatrick but died in 2001, before production began; the film is dedicated to Adams. The film received positive reviews from critics and grossed over $100 million worldwide.

Plot 
One Thursday morning, Arthur Dent discovers that his house is to be immediately demolished to make way for a bypass. He tries delaying the bulldozers by lying down in front of them. Ford Prefect, a friend of Arthur's, convinces him to go to a pub with him. Over several pints of beer, Ford explains that he is an alien from the vicinity of Betelgeuse, and a journalist working on the Hitchhiker's Guide to the Galaxy, a universal guide book. Ford warns that the Earth is to be demolished later that day by a race called Vogons, to make way for a hyperspace bypass.

As the Vogon fleet arrives in orbit to destroy Earth, Ford rescues Arthur by stowing them aboard one of the Vogon ships. The pair are shortly discovered and thrown out an airlock, only to be picked up by the starship Heart of Gold. They find Ford's "semi-cousin" Zaphod Beeblebrox, the newly elected president of the Galaxy. He has stolen the ship along with Tricia "Trillian" McMillan, an Earth woman whom Arthur had met previously, and Marvin the Paranoid Android, a clinically depressed robot.

Zaphod seeks the Ultimate Question of Life, the Universe, and Everything to match the disappointing answer given by the supercomputer Deep Thought: "42". He believes that the answer lies on the planet Magrathea, only accessible using the Heart of Gold improbability drives through trial and error.

On one attempt, they arrive at Viltvodle VI, where Zaphod's opponent, Humma Kavula, resides. Kavula offers the coordinates for Magrathea in exchange for Zaphod recovering the Point-of-View gun, a gun created by Deep Thought that makes anyone it blasts temporarily see things from the shooter's perspective. Trillian is captured by the Vogons as they depart, and the three mount a rescue effort on the Vogon homeworld. Before her rescue, Trillian learns that Zaphod signed the order for the destruction of Earth, thinking that the Vogon with the permission form just wanted his autograph.

The group escapes the Vogons, followed by Galactic Vice-President Questular Rontok and the Vogons. They arrive at Magrathea but trigger its automated missile defense systems. Arthur re-activates the improbability drive to transform the missiles into a bowl of petunias and a whale, allowing them to land safely on the planet. Zaphod, Ford, and Trillian enter a portal to arrive at Deep Thought, though Arthur and Marvin are stranded outside the portal. They learn from Deep Thought that after coming up with the Answer "42", its creators had Deep Thought design another computer to come up with the Question, that being Earth. They recover the Point-of-View gun, though Trillian uses it on Zaphod to show him her resentment for his accidental destruction of the Earth. They are captured by unknown entities.

Meanwhile, on Magrathea, Arthur is met by Slartibartfast, one of the planet builders. Slartibartfast takes Arthur to a pocket dimension inside the planet where he shows that a new version of Earth is near completion. Slartibartfast takes Arthur to his recreated home, where inside, the others are enjoying a feast provided by the pan-dimensional beings who commissioned Arthur's original Earth, and who resembles a pair of mice. With Arthur, who was on Earth up until the last minutes, the mice think they can discover the Question by removing his brain. Arthur manages to escape and crush the mice under a teapot; they disappear without a trace.

Suddenly, Questular and the Vogons arrive outside the home and open fire. The group takes shelter in a caravan, but Marvin, left alone, uses the Point-of-View gun to make the entire Vogon force too depressed to continue fighting, making both of them to break down. The Vogons are taken away, while Zaphod reunites with Questular. Arthur decides to explore the galaxy with Ford and Trillian, allowing Slartibartfast to finalize the new Earth without him. The Heart of Gold crew decides to visit the Restaurant at the End of the Universe.

Cast

 Sam Rockwell as Zaphod Beeblebrox, the President of the Galaxy
 Mos Def as Ford Prefect, the "semi-cousin" of Zaphod
 Zooey Deschanel as Trillian, an Earth woman
 Martin Freeman as Arthur Dent, a man who gets roped into Zaphod's quest
 Bill Nighy as Slartibartfast, a planet builder
 Warwick Davis as Marvin, an android who is clinically depressed
 Anna Chancellor as Questular, the Vice-President of the Galaxy
 Alan Rickman as voice of Marvin
 Helen Mirren as voice of Deep Thought, a super-computer
 Stephen Fry as Narrator
 John Malkovich as Humma Kavula, Zaphod's opponent from the planet Vildvodle VI

In addition, Bill Bailey voices the whale, Ian McNeice voices Kwaltz, Richard Griffiths voices Jeltz and Thomas Lennon voices Eddie the computer. Simon Jones, who portrayed Arthur Dent in both the BBC radio and BBC television adaptations of Hitchhiker's, makes a cameo appearance as the Ghostly Image.

Production

Development

Bringing The Hitchhiker's Guide to a theatrical version started as early as the 1970s, as documented in The Greatest Sci-Fi Movies Never Made by David Hughes. Douglas Adams had been approached by one unnamed producer and separately by the American Broadcasting Company network during the 1970s to turn the book into a film, but Adams refused both offers, as he feared they wanted to turn the work into "Star Wars with jokes". In 1982, Adams signed an option for the film with producers Ivan Reitman, Joe Medjuck and Michael C. Gross, and completed three scripts for them. As part of the rewrites, Medjuck and Gross offered the idea of bringing in either Bill Murray or Dan Aykroyd to play Ford Prefect. However, Aykroyd separately proposed a different story to Reitman, which led to this project becoming the basis for Ghostbusters. This left Adams flustered about the film's development in making sure there was the necessary commitment to the project. However, the event did serve the idea of making Prefect an American as to better draw in that audience.

Movement on the film was quiet until around 2001, when director Jay Roach, using the clout he had gained from Austin Powers: International Man of Mystery and Meet the Parents, secured a new deal with Adams and production through Disney. Adams wrote a new script, and Roach sought talent like Spike Jonze to direct, Hugh Laurie to play Arthur, and Jim Carrey as Zaphod, but then Adams died on 11 May 2001. Neither Roach nor the film's executive producer Robbie Stamp wanted to see their work go for naught after Adams' death. Roach brought in Karey Kirkpatrick to complete the screenplay based on Adams' final draft, submitted just before his death. Kirkpatrick used what notes Adams had left, finding that Adams was willing to go off the book's narrative to adapt to the film. He considered his screenplay something in the spirit that Adams had set out based on the whole of Adams' work.

Some time after Adams' death, Roach decided to drop out of the project, and, on recommendation from Jonze – one of several directors asked to do the film – Roach turned to director Garth Jennings and producer Nick Goldsmith, collectively known as Hammer & Tongs, to take up the work.

Casting
In a Slashdot interview, Stamp stated the following about the cast:
 The hardest character to cast was "the voice of the Guide itself and in the end came back to somebody who was one of the people Douglas himself had wanted, namely Stephen Fry."
 "Douglas himself is on record as saying that as far as he was concerned the only character who had to be British, indeed English, was Arthur Dent."
Stamp also commented on how large a role the studio and screenwriters other than Adams played in making the film:
 "I think that a lot of fans would be surprised to know just how much of a free hand we have been given in the making of this movie. I know how easy it is to see every decision to cut a scene as 'studio' pressure but it was always much more to do with pacing and rhythm in the film itself."
 "The script we shot was very much based on the last draft that Douglas wrote... All the substantive new ideas in the movie... are brand new Douglas ideas written especially for the movie by him... Douglas was always up for reinventing HHGG in each of its different incarnations and he knew that working harder on some character development and some of the key relationships was an integral part of turning HHGG into a movie."

Filming
Shooting was completed in August 2004, and the film was released on 28 April 2005 in Europe, Australia and New Zealand, and on the following day in Canada and the United States. The pre-title sequence was shot in Loro Parque, Puerto de la Cruz, Tenerife.

Marketing

The film trailer featured voice over work by Stephen Fry as the Guide, describing the Hitchhiker's Guide to the Galaxys entry on movie trailers.

An audio collection called "Additional Guide Entries", read by Fry, was released to iTunes to promote the film. The entries were set to music by Joby Talbot and written by Tim Browse and Sean Sollé (with the exception of the How to be Cool entry, which was also co-written by Yoz Grahame).

The "Hitchhiker's Guide to Technology" claims that if you make yourself a cup of tea and attempt to get an object working and the tea goes cold before you finish, you are dealing with technology. Other guides include the Hitchhiker's Guide to Blogging the Hitchhiker's Guide to Deadlines, and the Hitchhiker's Guide to How to be Cool which discusses how an individual can truly be cool, instead of by following crowds, but concludes by suggesting the listener attend a showing of The Hitchhiker's Guide to the Galaxy. The Guide to Websites, which only appeared on the official UK movie website, described a website as "a wonderful new invention that allows people you neither know nor care about to inform you what they had for breakfast this morning, without all that tedious mucking about in the postal system". The Guide to Fanboys, written by Touchstone Pictures' copywriters as part of their promotion, only ever appeared as website text. Though released at the same time as the iTunes entries, it was never intended to be recorded and is otherwise unconnected with the Fry/Talbot/Browse works.

Reception

Critical reaction
Rotten Tomatoes, a review aggregator, reports that 60% of 200 surveyed critics gave the film a positive review; the average rating is 6.09/10.  The site's consensus reads: "A frantic and occasional funny adaptation of Douglas Adams' novel. However, it may have those unfamiliar with the source material scratching their heads." Metacritic gives it 63/100, indicating "generally favourable" reviews. Audiences polled by CinemaScore gave the film an average grade "B−" on an A+ to F scale. Empire magazine rated the film four stars out of five and said it was a "very British, very funny sci-fi misadventure that's guaranteed to win converts".

Roger Ebert gave the film two stars out of four:

Manohla Dargis called it "hugely likable" with a story arc structured "more or less" as "a long beginning and then an ending"; she calls Jim Henson's Creature Shop's Vogons "beautifully constructed" and noted that Sam Rockwell's performance is "sensational, ... riffing on Elvis and the current President George Bush". Peter Bradshaw gave the film three stars out of five and said, "The film is no disgrace, and honours the Guide's gentle, low-tech BBC origins. But it doesn't do justice to the open-ended inventiveness of the original. The inevitable Anglo-American accommodations of casting have muddled its identity and the performances of the new American stars can be uneasy. It somehow seems heavier-footed and slower-moving than Adams's concept; the gravity is stronger... The savour and flavour of the Adams original, its playfully ruminative feel, has been downgraded in favour of a jolly but less interesting outerspace romp."

Philip French, after describing the Vogons as "a species resembling Laughton's version of Quasimodo" and writing it is "not, except in its financing, anything resembling a standard Hollywood production", called the film "slightly old-fashioned (few things date as rapidly as science fiction and our view of the future) and somewhat commonplace through its embracing familiar special effects. The jokes have to compete with the hardware and the actors executing them often exude a feeling of desperation... It's funnier, and obviously cleverer, than Spaceballs, Mel Brooks's puerile spoof on Star Wars, but a good bit less engaging than Galaxy Quest."

Commercial box office
The movie was released on 28 April 2005 in the United Kingdom making  in its first week. It was released a day later in North America, making  in its opening weekend, opening in first place. In the United States, the movie remained in the box office top ten for its first four weeks of release. The movie's total box office gross was $104,478,416 worldwide. According to Freeman, the film would be unlikely to merit a sequel; he stated "I found that out from the horse's mouth, [director] Garth Jennings. I had dinner with him and he said [the first one] just didn't do well enough."

Awards
The movie was nominated for seven different awards and won one. It won the Golden Trailer Award under the category Most Original. It was nominated for: the Artios award from Casting Society of America, United States under the category Best Featured Film Casting-Comedy in 2005; the Empire Awards from Empire Awards, UK under the categories Best British Film and Best Comedy in 2006; the Golden Trailer from Golden Trailer Awards under the category Best Voice Over; and Teen Choice Award for Choice Movie: Action and Choice Rap Artist in a Movie: Mos Def.

Soundtrack

The complete motion picture soundtrack was released as an iTunes Music Store exclusive (in the United States and the United Kingdom) on 12 April 2005, two weeks before the scheduled CD release. The iTunes Music Store also has two further exclusive sets of tracks related to the movie:
 The Marvin Mixes are remixes of a new version of "Reasons to be Miserable", here performed by Stephen Fry, as well as a new vocal and a new instrumental track for "Marvin", also performed by Fry. Stephen Moore had recorded the vocals of both tracks in 1981.
 The Guide Entries are new spoken "Hitchhiker's Guide" entries, all read by Fry, with accompanying music by Joby Talbot (with further orchestrations by Christopher Austin), who wrote the film score.

The track "Humma's Hymn" on the soundtrack was sung in St. Michael's Church in Highgate, London by members of local church choirs along with a congregation consisting of members of the public. The recording was open to anyone wishing to attend, and was publicised on the internet, including in a post to the Usenet group alt.fan.douglas-adams.

The first version of the song "So Long, and Thanks for All the Fish" is a Broadway-style, lively version sung by the dolphins before they leave Earth. The second plays over the end credits and is in the style of smooth jazz. The song was written by English composer Joby Talbot, conductor Christopher Austin, and director Garth Jennings and performed by the Tenebrae Choir. Neil Hannon, founder and frontman of the Irish pop group The Divine Comedy, of which Talbot is a former member, lent his vocals to the version of the song played during the ending credits. The song, in its "bouncy", opening version, was translated into and performed in Spanish for the Latin-American Region 4 DVD release.

A reworked version of the theme from the 1981 television adaptation was also included in the score.

Home media
The movie was released on DVD (Region 2, PAL) in the United Kingdom on 5 September 2005. Both a standard double disc edition and a UK-exclusive "Gift Set" edition were released on this date. The standard double disc edition features:
 Making-of
 Additional guide entries (see marketing, above)
 Deleted scenes
 Really deleted scenes (scenes that were never really meant to be in the movie, just for fun)
 Sing-a-long
 Audio commentaries
 Set Top Games: Marvin's Hangman
 Don't Crash (68-minute UK exclusive "making of" documentary, directed by Grant Gee)
The "Gift Set" edition includes a copy of the novel with a "movie tie-in" cover, and collectible prints from the film, packaged in a replica of the film's version of the Hitchhiker's Guide prop.

Single disc widescreen and full-screen editions (Region 1, NTSC) were released in the United States and Canada on 13 September 2005. They have a different cover, but contain the same special features (except the Don't Crash documentary) as the UK version.

Single disc releases in the UMD format for the PlayStation Portable were also released on the respective dates in these three countries.

The movie was made available as a paid download in the iTunes Store starting in September 2006, for the American market only. A region-free Blu-ray Disc version was released in January 2007.

References

Further reading

 The Hitchhiker's Guide to the Galaxy UK Region 2 DVD Release, 2005. Includes commentaries by Garth Jennings, Nick Goldsmith, Martin Freeman and Bill Nighy, and Robbie Stamp with Sean Sollé. Also includes the documentary Don't Crash: The Making of the Film of the Novel of the Radio Series of The Hitchhiker's Guide to the Galaxy.

External links

 
 
 
 
 "Hitchhiker Movie FAQ with FUA"
 Washington Post review
 New York Times review
 BBC Review: Hitchhiker's Guide to the Galaxy
 Interviews with Robbie Stamp (exclusive producer), Garth Jennings (Director) and a visit to the movie set

The Hitchhiker's Guide to the Galaxy
2005 films
2000s adventure comedy films
2000s science fiction comedy films
British space adventure films
British science fiction comedy films
American adventure comedy films
American science fiction comedy films
American space adventure films
Films about extraterrestrial life
Films about artificial intelligence
Fiction about intergalactic travel
Films based on British novels
Films based on radio series
Films based on science fiction novels
Films directed by Garth Jennings
Films produced by Roger Birnbaum
Films shot in the Canary Islands
Films shot at Elstree Film Studios
Films set on fictional planets
Films set on spacecraft
Films with live action and animation
Works by Douglas Adams
Films with screenplays by Karey Kirkpatrick
British post-apocalyptic films
Spyglass Entertainment films
Touchstone Pictures films
2005 directorial debut films
2005 comedy films
2000s English-language films
2000s American films
2000s British films